Gelechia longipalpella is a moth of the family Gelechiidae. It is found in Lithuania.

References

Moths described in 1899
Gelechia